Mario Brignoli (20 February 1902 – 8 January 1990) was an Italian racewalker who competed at the 1936 Summer Olympics.

References

External links
 

1902 births
1990 deaths
Athletes (track and field) at the 1936 Summer Olympics
Italian male racewalkers
Olympic athletes of Italy
20th-century Italian people